A Woman on Fire (also known as Burn, Boy, Burn) is a 1969 Italian erotic-drama film written and directed by Fernando Di Leo. It gained a great commercial success and launched the career of Di Leo as director.

Cast 
Gianni Macchia: Giancarlo
Françoise Prévost: Clara Frisotti
Michel Bardinet: Silvio Frisotti
Monica Strebel: Marina
Danika La Loggia (as Danika) : Aunt Bice
Anna Pagano : Monica
Ettore Geri
Franca Sciutto
Miriam Alex : Swiss Woman
Leonora Ruffo

References

External links

1969 films
1969 romantic drama films
Films directed by Fernando Di Leo
Italian romantic drama films
1960s erotic drama films
Italian erotic drama films
1960s Italian-language films
1960s Italian films